Pseudosalacia streyi is a species of plant in the family Celastraceae, and is the only species in the genus Pseudosalacia. It is endemic to South Africa.  It is threatened by habitat loss.

References

 
Celastrales genera
Flora of South Africa
Monotypic rosid genera
Vulnerable plants
Taxonomy articles created by Polbot